Women's Bay is located in the south of the island of Barbados, to the east of the nation's southernmost point, South Point. it is also known as Silver Sands.

Bays of Barbados